Cembalea hirsuta is a jumping spider species in the genus Cembalea that lives in Namibia. It was first described by Wanda Wesołowska in 2011.

References

Endemic fauna of Namibia
Salticidae
Fauna of Namibia
Spiders of Africa
Spiders described in 2011
Taxa named by Wanda Wesołowska